Dayton is the name of some places in the U.S. state of Wisconsin:
Dayton, Green County, Wisconsin, an unincorporated community
Dayton, Richland County, Wisconsin, a town
Dayton, Waupaca County, Wisconsin, a town